Rodrick Tai is a Papua New Guinean professional rugby league footballer who plays as a  and er for the Dolphins in the NRL and Papua New Guinea at international level.

Career
Tai made his international debut for Papua New Guinea in their 24-18 loss to Tonga in the 2021 Rugby League World Cup.

References

External links
PNG profile
PNG Hunters profile

1998 births
Living people
Papua New Guinea Hunters players
Papua New Guinea national rugby league team players
Papua New Guinean rugby league players
Rugby league centres